M-400 UAV was an experimental reconnaissance unmanned aerial vehicle was designed and built by the Institute of Technology Air Defense by the Vietnamese Ministry of Defense. Two M-400 UAVs were successfully launched in September 2005 after four years of construction with many test flights.

The UAV appears to be a small model type propeller driven aircraft. The UAV never entered full service in the Vietnamese People's Air Force (plans were to have twelve built) and is no longer in service due to lack of GPS to guide the craft and other critical components.

See also
 IAI Scout

External links
 Máy bay không người lái "Made in Việt Nam"

Military equipment of Vietnam
Single-engined tractor aircraft
Unmanned military aircraft of Vietnam